Fire, Ice and Dynamite (German original title Feuer, Eis und Dynamit) is a German feature-length sports film directed by Willy Bogner in 1990. It a sequel to Fire and Ice. The screenplay was written by Tony Williamson, based on an original story by Willy Bogner.

The film features cameos from Steffi Graf, Niki Lauda, Buzz Aldrin, Dennis Conner and Isaac Hayes.

Plot
The plot functions primarily as link between the stunt action scenes which mainly deal with skiing like in Fire and Ice. It also contains heavy product placement (for example, VW released a special edition of the Golf MK II named "Fire & Ice" which featured some special equipment details like the seat covers being said to be designed by Bogner himself).

Roger Moore plays an entrepreneur who is in debt with many companies. After faking his death by apparent suicide by jumping out of a plane, his children and several companies participate in several sporting events (skiing, rafting, bobsled etc.) for his $135 million estate - winner takes all. Additionally, a family of villains tries to get to the money.

DVD release
Lions Gate has yet to release the film onto DVD.  A PAL DVD release under the German title does exist, however.
Prism Leisure released the film on DVD in 2002, on a 2 Disc/4 DVD disc compilation consisting of Merchant of Death, Musketeers Forever, Fire Ice & Dynamite and Paradise Lost. payless (sic) Entertainment Limited has also released a PAL DVD under the film’s English title.

Cast

References

External links

1990 films
English-language German films
German sports comedy films
West German films
1990s sports comedy films
Skiing films
Films about fictional Olympics-inspired events
Films shot in Switzerland
Films set in the Alps
Films scored by Harold Faltermeyer
1990 comedy films
1990s English-language films
1990s German films